Yurdaer Okur (born 29 October 1974) is a Turkish film, television and stage actor.

Life and career 
Yurdaer Okur was born on 29 October 1974 in Rize. After finishing his high school in Bafra, he enrolled in Akdeniz University's tourism management program. After studying at this school for three years, he decided to change his major and in 1994 enrolled in Hacettepe University State Conservatory's theatre program. He later received his master's degree from Mimar Sinan Fine Arts University.

After being introduced to drama actor Genco Erkal in 1999, he joined the Dostlar Theatre and got a role in the play Barefoot in Athens. In the following year, he started working for the Istanbul State Theatre as a part time actor. In 2002, he joined the cast of Diyarbakır State Theatre. Starting from 2000, he acted in and directed various plays for the Turkish State Theatres. He also taught drama and acting lessons in Diyarbakır. Alongside his career on stage, Okur soon began appearing in a number of movies and television series.

He had a recurring role in the Netflix original series Hakan: Muhafız. Okur was also among the cast of 7. Koğuştaki Mucize. In 2020, he starred in the historical drama series Kuruluş: Osman as Balgay. In the following year he began portraying Tuğrul Bozan in another historical drama, titled Alparslan: Büyük Selçuklu.

Theatre

As actor 
 Barefoot in Athens : Maxwell Anderson – Dostlar Theatre – 1999
 Spaghetti mit Ketchup : Rainer Hachfeld – Istanbul State Theatre – 2000
 The Beauty Queen of Leenane : Martin McDonagh – Istanbul State Theatre – 2000
 Ben Ruhi Bey Nasılım : Edip Cansever – Istanbul State Theatre – 2001
 Benerci Kendini Niçin Öldürdü : Nâzım Hikmet – Istanbul State Theatre – 2001
 Dünyanın Ortasında Bir Yer : Özen Yula – Diyarbakır State Theatre – 2003
 Hortulus : Plautus – Diyarbakır State Theatre – 2003
 Yaşar Ne Yaşar Ne Yaşamaz : Aziz Nesin – Diyarbakır State Theatre – 2004
 Así que pasen cinco años : Federico García Lorca – Tiyatro Oyunevi – 2006
 The Pillowman : Martin McDonagh – Talimhane Theatre – 2009
 Ölümü Yaşamak : Orhan Asena – Diyarbakır State Theatre – 2010
 Babamın Cesetleri : Berkun Oya – Krek – 2012
 Kuvâyi Milliye - Kurtuluş Savaşı Destanı : Nâzım Hikmet – 2014 – Tiyatro 2000
 The Pillowman : Martin McDonagh – 2016 – Entropi Sahne
 Ran : Nâzım Hikmet – 2017 – Entropi Sahne
 The Beauty Queen of Leenane : Martin McDonagh – 2018

As director 
 Benim Güzel Pabuçlarım : Dersu Yavuz Altun – Diyarbakır State Theatre – 2004
 A Marriage Proposal : Anton Chekhov – Diyarbakır State Theatre – 2006
 Ich Feuerbach : Tankred Dorst – Trabzon State Theatre – 2011
 Mãos de Eurídice : Pedro Bloch – Ankara State Theatre – 2012
 Taziye : Murathan Mungan – Diyarbakır State Theatre – 2013–14
 Empty City : Dejan Dukovski – Entropi Sahne – 2017
 The Little Prince : Antoine de Saint-Exupéry – Entropi Sahne – 2019
 The Dumb Waiter : Harold Pinter – Entropi Sahne – 2019

Filmography

References

External links 
 
 

1974 births
Living people
Turkish male stage actors
Turkish male television actors
Turkish male film actors
Hacettepe University Ankara State Conservatory alumni
People from Rize